The 1968 Humboldt State Lumberjacks football team represented Humboldt State College during the 1968 NCAA College Division football season. Humboldt State competed in the Far Western Conference (FWC).

The 1968 Lumberjacks were led by third-year head coach Bud Van Deren. They played home games at the Redwood Bowl in Arcata, California. Humboldt State finished the regular season ranked #16 in the AP poll and #10 in the UPI poll, with a record of nine wins and one loss (9–1, 6–0 FWC).

At the end of the season the Lumberjacks were invited to the Camellia Bowl. There was no playoff in the College Division at this time, so the Camellia Bowl was one of four regional championship games in the division. Humboldt State faced California Collegiate Athletic Association (CCAA) champion Fresno State and defeated the Bulldogs 29–14 to win the western region title.

The Camellia Bowl victory brought Humboldt State's final record to ten wins and one loss (10–1, 6–0 FWC).  The Lumberjacks outscored their opponents 375–138 for the season.

Schedule

Notes

References

Humboldt State
Humboldt State Lumberjacks football seasons
Northern California Athletic Conference football champion seasons
Humboldt State Lumberjacks football